Reliant Energy is an American energy company based in Houston, Texas.

History 
Headquartered in Houston, Texas, Reliant Energy, a subsidiary of NRG Energy, is one of the largest Texas electricity providers serving over 1.5 million Texans. Reliant provides over 23 million megawatts of power annually to residential and business customers.

Reliant Energy was founded in 2000. In June 2009, NRG Energy purchased Reliant Energy's retail electricity business. At the time, Reliant had 1.8 million customers and was the second largest electric provider in Texas. The name Reliant Energy was retained and the surviving wholesale business was renamed RRI Energy, which was retired in 2012 after additional NRG acquisitions.

In 2010, Reliant Energy received a $20 million grant from the U.S. Department of Energy as part of the DOE’s Recovery Act activities to fund a suite of Smart Grid products for upgrades of the nation’s electricity grid.

Over the last six months of 2017, the Public Utility Commission of Texas received a total of 118 complaints against Reliant including 22 slamming, and 2 cramming violations.

Ratings and reviews
Reliant Energy has received an A+ rating from the Better Business Bureau. The BBB reports 194 complaints against the company in the last 3 years.

Deregulation of electricity in Texas
On January 1, 2002, Texas deregulated the electricity industry and now there are 116 retail electric providers (REPs) currently doing business in the state. Texas is one of 18 states that offers some level of deregulated electricity, with the state having the largest percentage (approximately 85%) of residents who are able to choose their service provider.

With deregulation the transmission and distribution of the electricity is handled by Transmission and Distribution Utilities (TDUs) that must offer access to their wires to all REPs on a non-discriminatory basis.

Following the deregulation of the market, Reliant Energy began competing with other large energy companies in the state, including Direct Energy and TXU Corporation. Reliant Energy offers service to some of the largest cities in Texas including the Dallas/Fort Worth area in northeastern Texas, Houston and surrounding cities on the Gulf of Mexico including Corpus Christi and Galveston, and as far west as Midland.

Renewable energy
Reliant Energy provides solar and wind turbine renewable energy options for its customers. The renewable energy options are only available in areas where the TDUs offer the service. Reliant provides sell back options for excess energy generated by an individual.

In June 2013, the City of Houston signed a renewable energy agreement with Reliant, as part of Houston’s dedication to improving energy efficiency and increasing the use of solar and wind power as energy sources. This deal included the purchase of 140 MW of wind energy output from 2013 to 2015.

References

NRG Energy
2000 establishments in Texas
American companies established in 2000
Corporate subsidiaries